Poème symphonique may refer to:
Poème symphonique for 100 metronomes, by György Ligeti
Ce qu'on entend sur la montagne, Poème symphonique no. 1, by Franz Liszt
Tasso, Lamento e Trionfo (Liszt), Poème symphonique no. 2, by Franz Liszt
Les préludes, Poème symphonique no. 3, by Franz Liszt
Orpheus (Liszt), Poème symphonique no. 4, by Franz Liszt
Prometheus (Liszt), Poème symphonique no. 5, by Franz Liszt
Mazeppa (symphonic poem), Poème symphonique no. 6, by Franz Liszt
Hunnenschlacht (Liszt), Poème symphonique no. 11, by Franz Liszt